The 2017 Ohio Machine season was the sixth season for the Ohio Machine of Major League Lacrosse. The Machine entered trying to continue their success from 2016 when they finished with an 8-6 record, good enough for the top postseason seed following tiebreaker procedures. However, the top seed did not guarantee them a championship win, as they lost in the 2016 Steinfeld Cup 19-18 to the Denver Outlaws. After defeating the Florida Launch in the semifinal game on August 12, the Machine captured their first title in franchise history with a 17-12 victory over the same Denver Outlaws.

On November 17, 2016, the Machine announced they were moving into a brand new 6,500-seat stadium Fortress Obetz in time for their 2017 home opener. The new stadium would be in the village of Obetz on the former site of the Columbus Motor Speedway and become the third home venue in team history. The Machine lost their home opener at the new Fortress Obetz on May 6 to the Rochester Rattlers, 12-11 in overtime.

For the second straight season, the Machine clinched a playoff berth with a convincing win over the New York Lizards. The team also clinched a home playoff game on July 29 by defeating the Lizards, 21-14. The Machine lost the following week to finish 9-5 and take the second seed into the postseason.

Schedule

Regular season

Postseason

Standings

References

External links
 Team Website

Major League Lacrosse seasons
Ohio Machine